Aselle Tasmagambetova (born October 27, 1979) is the daughter of former Kazakh Prime Minister Imangali Tasmagambetov. She is married to Kenes Rakishev, a Kazakh businessperson who is close to the authoritarian regime in Kazakhstan.

Biography
Born October 27, 1979, she is the eldest daughter of the Kazakh politician Imangali Tasmagambetov and school teacher Klara Bekkulova. She graduated from Kazakh State Law University with degree in Jurispridence in 1999, then graduated from International Independent University of Environmental and Politology in Moscow with degree in «Management of the environment and natural resources» in 2009.

She has taught environmental law in Al-Farabi Kazakh National University. In 2012 she established Central Asian Institute for Ecological Research. In 2019 she created the Center for Research and Rehabilitation of Caspian seal in Aktau city. She runs a charity, the "Saby" Private Charity Foundation.

Family
 Father — Imangali Tasmagambetov (born 1956 ), politician.
 Mother — Klara Bekkulova (born 1957), teacher.
 Husband — Kenes Rakishev (born 1979), businessman, chair of the board of Fincraft Resources holding company, Net Element.
 Sons — Dinmukhammed (born 2000), Nuruddin (born 2005).
 Daughters — Sirin (born 2013), Iman (born 2016).
 Sister — Sofya (born 1983), Kazakhstani artistic director, scene designer.
 Brother — Nursultan (born 1994).

Awards and titles
 «Kurmet» order (2016)
 Honorary citizen of Semey

References 

Kazakhstani people
1979 births
Living people